Oedaspis trapezoidalis is a species of tephritid or fruit flies in the genus Oedaspis of the family Tephritidae.

Distribution
Congo, Tanzania, South Africa.

References

Tephritinae
Insects described in 1938
Diptera of Africa